Arturo Perez Vertti Ferrer (born September 10, 1991 in Ensenada, Baja California) is a Mexican swimmer. At the 2012 Summer Olympics, he competed in the Men's 1500 metre freestyle, finishing in 22nd place overall in the heats, failing to qualify for the final.  He has also competed at World Short Course and Long Course Championships.

References

External links
 

1991 births
Living people
Olympic swimmers of Mexico
Swimmers at the 2012 Summer Olympics
Mexican male freestyle swimmers
Sportspeople from Baja California
People from Ensenada, Baja California
Swimmers at the 2011 Pan American Games
Swimmers at the 2015 Pan American Games
Swimmers at the 2019 Pan American Games
Pan American Games competitors for Mexico
Competitors at the 2010 Central American and Caribbean Games
Competitors at the 2014 Central American and Caribbean Games
Central American and Caribbean Games silver medalists for Mexico
Central American and Caribbean Games bronze medalists for Mexico
Central American and Caribbean Games medalists in swimming
21st-century Mexican people